Piggy is a 2022 horror thriller film written and directed by Carlota Pereda, based on her 2019 short film of the same name. The cast, led by Laura Galán (who reprises her role from the short film), also features Richard Holmes, Carmen Machi, Claudia Salas, Irene Ferreiro, Camille Aguilar and Pilar Castro.

Plot 
Sara, labelled Cerdita by bully Maca and her friends Roci and Claudia, is an overweight teenage girl living in a small town in Extremadura. One day during the summer, Sara decides to visit the local swimming pool, only to be discovered by the three bullies, who torment her and steal her backpack and clothes. While walking home, she is harassed by a group of men and escapes onto a side road, where she sees a parked van which, initially unbeknownst to her, an unnamed man is using to kidnap her bullies. Claudia appears through the rear window, but Sara ignores her pleas for help as the kidnapper, who was also present at the pool, leaves her Claudia's towel before driving off. Sara returns home, deciding not to tell anyone about what happened.

News reaches the town that the pool's lifeguard has been found dead, and that its waitress has gone missing, along with the three girls. Sara and her mother Asun go to the pool, where Sara is questioned by both Asun and the local Civil Guard about what she saw, and denies having been at the pool that afternoon. Later that night, Sara realises that she can track her mobile phone, which the girls had stolen the previous day, to help determine the whereabouts of the bullies. She steals her father's phone and ventures into the forest, where she manages to locate her backpack and phone. In doing so, she has a second encounter with the kidnapper, who warns her to be quiet and begins to display some affection towards her before escaping. At the same time, some family members of the missing girls, including Claudia's mother Elena, undertake their own investigation in the forest, during which they find the body of the missing waitress.

After Sara returns home, Pedro, a friend of the missing girls, comes to her house and invites her out. He introduces her to marijuana and reveals that he knows she was lying about not being at the pool on the day the girls disappeared. He also reveals that the townspeople suspect him to be responsible for the disappearance, and Sara promises to disclose what she saw to the Civil Guard if he is arrested. They return to the town, where a hysterical Elena attacks Sara before Pedro reveals her truth to the assembled crowd. Sara is taken in by the Civil Guard for questioning and begins to tell them the information she has, but the sudden onset of her period prevents further interrogation. 

Unbeknownst to Sara and Asun, the kidnapper has come to their home and attacked Sara's father. Sara and Asun have a heated argument, during which the kidnapper incapacitates Asun and takes Sara in his van to a warehouse in an unknown location. There, Sara discovers Roci and Claudia, who are still alive but have been gagged and hung from hooks by their hands. She removes the gags and attempts to untie them, but the kidnapper returns before she can do so. She discovers Maca's decomposing body while attempting to flee, and is found by the kidnapper, who embraces her and tries to get her to kill the girls. She instead attacks him, and in the chaos he accidentally fires his shotgun, blowing off Claudia's hand. Sara kills the kidnapper by biting a chunk out of his neck, and uses his shotgun to free the girls by shooting the ropes to which they were tied up. She flees to find help, encountering Pedro on a motorbike, ultimately riding with him back to the town.

Cast

Production 

Piggy, Carlota Pereda's feature film debut, is based on Pereda's short film of the same name, which won the Goya Award and the Forqué Award for Best Short Film in 2019 and stars Laura Galán, Paco Hidalgo, Sara Barroso, Mireia Vilapuig and Jorge Elorza.

The feature film saw the return of the short film's lead actress (Laura Galán), and it was completed by Richard Holmes, Carmen Machi, Claudia Salas, Irene Ferreiro, Camille Aguilar, José Pastor, Pilar Castro and Chema del Barco. Rita Noriega took over cinematography duties.

A Spain–France co-production boasting a €2.5 million budget, the film was produced by  alongside Backup Studio and Cerdita AIE in association with La Banque Postale and Indéfilms, with the participation of RTVE and Movistar+, and support from the Junta de Extremadura, Eurimages, the Creative Europe's MEDIA sub-programme and the Madrid's regional administration. The white color C15, a staple of rural Spain, prominently features in the film.

Filming began on 17 June 2021 and wrapped in late July. Shooting locations included the village of Villanueva de la Vera (Extremadura) and its surroundings.

Release 
Piggy had its world premiere at the Sundance Film Festival on 24 January 2022. It had its UK premiere at the FrightFest on 29 August 2022. It was presented in the 'Tabakalera-Zabaltegui' section of the 70th San Sebastián International Film Festival in September 2022. Distributed by Filmax, it was theatrically released in Spain on 14 October 2022. Likewise, the film, distributed by Backup Media, was set for a 19 October 2022 release in French cinemas, later re-scheduled to 2 November 2022.

Magnet Releasing acquired North American rights, whereas Vertigo Releasing did so for the United Kingdom and Ireland. Other distribution deals include those with Alamode (Germany), Praesens (Switzerland), I Wonder (Italy), Nonstop Entertainment (Scandinavia and Baltics) and ADS Service (Hungary). Predated by a sneak pre-screening on 4 October 2022, the film received a limited release in the United States in Alamo Drafthouse theatres on 7 October 2022, followed by a wider release elsewhere in the US a week later.

Reception 

Jonathan Holland of Screen Daily wrote that the film "smartly mashes up thriller, rural drama and comedy elements into a lovingly-crafted, potently atmospheric, and thought-provoking whole — with bucketsful of horrible blood thrown in for good measure", and praised the "terrific" character work. Guy Lodge of Variety wrote that the film "sits at an unexpected intersection of artistic sensibilities, first recalling Catherine Breillat, then Brian De Palma, before taking a deep, bloody plunge into grindhouse territory toward its unsettling, ambiguous finale", comparing Sara's journey to Carrie's. David Rooney of The Hollywood Reporter presented the film as a "disturbing psychological drama" spiraling "into blood-drenched horror", considering that while Machi's performance is terrific, Galán's "riveting" performance is the one carrying the film.

Top ten lists 
The film appeared on a number of critics' top ten lists of the best Spanish films of 2022:

Accolades 

|-
| rowspan = "6" align = "center" | 2022 || 40th Brussels International Fantastic Film Festival || colspan = "2" | Critics Selection ||  || 
|-
| 17th Fantastic Fest || colspan = "2" | Best Picture (Horror Competition) ||  || align = "center" | 
|-
| 15th Strasbourg European Fantastic Film Festival || colspan = "2" | Méliès d'Argent ||  || 
|-
| 55th Sitges Film Festival || colspan = "2" | Méliès d'Or ||  || 
|-
| 27th Toulouse Spanish Film Festival || Best Actress || Laura Galán ||  || align = "center" | 
|-
| 28th Forqué Awards || Best Film Actress || Laura Galán ||  || 
|-
| rowspan = "20" align = "center" | 2023 || rowspan = "6" | 10th Feroz Awards || Best Director || Carlota Pereda ||  || rowspan = "6" | 
|-
| Best Screenplay || Carlota Pereda || 
|-
| Best Actress in a Film || Laura Galán || 
|-
| Best Supporting Actress in a Film || Carmen Machi || 
|-
| Best Film Poster || Eduardo Garcia, Jorge Fuembuena || 
|-
| Best Trailer || Marta Longás || 
|-
| rowspan = "4" | 78th CEC Medals || Best New Director || Carlota Pereda ||  || rowspan = "4" align = "center" | 
|-
| Best Supporting Actress || Carmen Machi || 
|-
| Best New Actress || Laura Galán || 
|-
| Best Adapted Screenplay || Carlota Pereda || 
|-
| rowspan = "6" | 37th Goya Awards || Best New Director  || Carlota Pereda ||  || rowspan = "6" | 
|-
| Best Adapted Screenplay || Carlota Pereda || 
|-
| Best New Actress || Laura Galán || 
|-
| Best Supporting Actress || Carmen Machi ||  
|-
| Best Makeup and Hairstyles || Paloma Lozano, Nacho Díaz || 
|-
| Best Production Supervision || Sara García || 
|-
| rowspan = "2" | 31st Actors and Actresses Union Awards || Best Film Actress in a Secondary Role || Carmen Machi ||  || rowspan = "2" | 
|-
| Best New Actress || Laura Galán || 
|-
| rowspan = "2" | 10th Platino Awards || Best Actress || Laura Galán ||  || rowspan = "2" | 
|-
| Best Supporting Actress || Carmen Machi || 
|}

See also 
 List of Spanish films of 2022
 List of French films of 2022

Notes

References

External links 
 

2022 films
2022 directorial debut films
2022 horror thriller films
2022 independent films
2020s French films
2020s Spanish films
2020s Spanish-language films
Features based on short films
Films about bullying
Films set in Spain
Films shot in the province of Cáceres
French films about revenge
French horror thriller films
French independent films
Morena Films films
Spanish films about revenge
Spanish horror thriller films
Spanish independent films
Spanish-language French films